Fort Nassau was the first Dutch fort built on Banda (or Bandaneira) Island, the main island of the Banda Islands, part of Maluku in Indonesia, completed in 1609. Its purpose was to control the trade in nutmeg, which at that time was only grown in the Banda Islands.

The Portuguese had previously attempted to build a fort in this location in 1529, but after constructing the foundations, they abandoned the work due to hostility from the Bandanese people. 

On 25 April 1609, the Dutch fleet commander, Admiral Verhoeven, sent 750 soldiers ashore to commence their fort, choosing the Portuguese foundations as the location. The Bandanese, threatened by the new fort and the strength of the Dutch presence, and opposed to the Dutch plan to monopolise the Bandanese nutmeg industry attacked the Dutch, killing Admiral Verhoeven and 40 of his men.

The Dutch hurried the fort to completion, and it served as their principal administrative and military base in the Banda's, later supplemented by other forts on Banda Besar, Forts Hollandia and Concordia, and Ai, Fort Revenge.

Fort Nassau was a large four-bastioned quadrilateral structure, located by the channel between Banda and Banda Besar Islands. Today Fort Nassau is overlooked by the more impressive Fort Belgica. It is currently damaged and dilapidated, however two bastions and substantial walls can still be seen.

References

Sources

See also

List of forts 

Nassau
Dutch East Indies
1609 establishments in the Dutch Empire
Buildings and structures in Maluku (province)